Karazin is a Russian masculine surname, its feminine counterpart is Karazina. It may refer to
Christelyn Karazin, American writer, columnist, and blogger 
Nikolay Karazin (1842–1908), Russian military officer, painter and writer
Vasily Karazin (1773–1842), Russian intellectual, inventor and scientific publisher

See also
Karamzin

Russian-language surnames